The Panciatichi Holy Family or Panciatichi Madonna and Child is a 1541 oil on panel painting by Bronzino, signed on a stone in the bottom left corner. It is now in the Uffizi in Florence, where it was first recorded in the Tribuna in 1704, where it remained until 2010, when it was moved as part of the "New Uffizi" project. Preparatory drawings for the work are in the Uffizi's Gabinetto dei Disegni e delle Stampe (n. 6639F0) and (with variations) in the Phillips collection in London.

It may have been one of two "large paintings of Our Lady with other figures, beautiful and marvellous" which Vasari's Lives of the Artists mentions as being produced by Bronzino for Bartolomeo Panciatichi, chamberlain to Cosimo I de' Medici. A few years later Vincenzo Borghini mentioned "two paintings of the Glorified Virgin with other very beautiful figures" in the Panciatichi household. The Panciatichi link is supported by the flag with their coat of arms flying from a turret in the top left background. 

The work's dating is more complex, but is thought to be close to the same artist's execution of portraits of Lucrezia and Bartolomeo, two members of the Panciatichi family, that is 1541, the year of the family's admission to the Accademia fiorentina.

References

Paintings of the Holy Family
Paintings depicting John the Baptist
Paintings by Bronzino
Paintings in the collection of the Uffizi
1541 paintings